Maksim Alexeyevich Purkayev (August 14 (26), 1894, in the village of Nalitovo, Russian Empire – January 1, 1953, Moscow) was a Soviet military leader, reaching service rank of Army General.

Biography 
Purkayev was conscripted into the Imperial Russian Army in 1915, and reached the rank of praporshchik before joining the Red Army in 1918. He became a member of the Communist Party in 1919. During the Russian Civil War he served in the capacity of a company and battalion commander, and after completing the Vystrel officer training course in 1923, he served as a regimental commander (24th Rifle Division, staff officer and commander of a division until 1936 when he commenced studies at the Frunze Military Academy.

From 1938 Purkayev served as the Chief of Staff of the Belorussian Military District, as the Soviet military attaché in Berlin at the start of the Second World War in 1939, and participated in planning of the Soviet invasion of Poland. From July 1940, Purkayev served as the Chief of Staff of the Kiev Special Military District, and from the start of the Soviet-German War serving as the Chief of Staff of the Southwestern Front (June–July 1941), and later the 60th Army and 3rd Shock Army. In 1942–43 he served as commander of the Kalinin Front and from April 1943, the Far Eastern Front (from 1945 2nd Far Eastern Front). From September 1945 to January 1947 Purkayev served as the commanding officer of the Far Eastern Military District during which time he was nominated to the Supreme Soviet of USSR (1946–1950).

From June 1947 Purkayev was the Chief of Staff and 1st Deputy Commander-in-Chief of the Far Eastern Forces. From July 1952 to his death Purkayev served as the Chief of Higher Education Directorate of the Ministry of Defence of USSR.

Honours and awards
Maksim Purkayev was decorated with two Orders of Lenin (incl. 14 November 1943; "For exemplary fulfillment of the leadership of the Red Army mobilization, formation, acquisition and training of units and formations"), four Orders of the Red Banner, Order of Suvorov (1st class), Order of Kutuzov (1st class), and numerous medals.

Sources

Zalessky, K.A., Stalin's Empire: Biographical encyclopaedic dictionary, Moscow, Veche, 2000,

1894 births
1953 deaths
People from Dubyonsky District, Republic of Mordovia
People from Ardatovsky Uyezd (Simbirsk Governorate)
Mordvin people
Bolsheviks
Second convocation members of the Soviet of the Union
Army generals (Soviet Union)
Frunze Military Academy alumni
Russian military personnel of World War I
Soviet military personnel of the Russian Civil War
People of the Soviet invasion of Poland
Soviet military personnel of World War II
Recipients of the Order of Lenin
Recipients of the Order of the Red Banner
Recipients of the Order of Suvorov, 1st class
Recipients of the Order of Kutuzov, 1st class
Soviet military attachés